Agabus uliginosus is a species of beetle native to the Palearctic, including Europe, where it is only found in Austria, Belarus, Belgium, Great Britain including Shetland, Orkney, Hebrides and Isle of Man, Croatia, the Czech Republic, mainland Denmark, Estonia, Finland, mainland France, Germany, Hungary, Iceland, mainland Italy, Kaliningrad, Latvia, Lithuania, Luxembourg, mainland Norway, Poland, Romania, Russia, Slovakia, Slovenia,  Sweden, Switzerland, the Netherlands, Ukraine and Yugoslavia.

External links

Agabus uliginosus at Fauna Europaea
Global Biodiversity Information Facility

uliginosus
Beetles described in 1761
Taxa named by Carl Linnaeus